The Pakistan Eastern Railway was one of two divisions of Pakistan Railways which operated between 1961 and 1971. The company was headquartered in Chittagong. With the emergence of Bangladesh, it became Bangladesh Railway.

History
When Pakistan gained its independence from Britain in 1947, the Assam Bengal Railway was split between Pakistan and India. Approximately 2,600 kilometres of rail track fell within East Bengal's territory in Pakistan. The railway was then renamed to Eastern Bengal Railway, under control of the federal government. On 1 February 1961, the Eastern Bengal Railway was renamed to the Pakistan Eastern Railway and in the following year, control of Pakistan Eastern Railway was transferred from the federal government to the Government of East Pakistan. It was placed under the management of the Pakistan Eastern Railways Board with the effect from the financial year 1962-63 by Presidential Order of 9 June 1962.

Successors
With Bangladesh becoming independent in 1971, the Pakistan Eastern Railway renamed itself to Bangladesh Railway.

See also
 Rail transport in India#History
 Northeast Frontier Railway

References

External links
 Bangladesh railway timeline
 

Defunct railway companies of Pakistan
Pakistan Railways